Bolephthyphantes is a genus of dwarf spiders that was first described by Embrik Strand in 1901.  it contains only three species: B. caucasicus, B. index, and B. indexoides.

See also
 List of Linyphiidae species

References

Araneomorphae genera
Cosmopolitan spiders
Linyphiidae
Taxa named by Embrik Strand